Riga Academy is a historic building located at Riga in Monroe County, New York. It was constructed in 1811 and is a two-story, five bay Federal style building.  Built originally as a tavern and inn, it was converted for use as an academy in 1846.  It was used as a school from 1847 to 1861, at which time it became a private residence.

It was listed on the National Register of Historic Places in 1980.

References

Houses on the National Register of Historic Places in New York (state)
Defunct schools in New York (state)
Federal architecture in New York (state)
Houses completed in 1811
Houses in Monroe County, New York
National Register of Historic Places in Monroe County, New York